Florea Lepǎdatu (24 March 1926 – 1981) was a Romanian cross-country skier who competed in the 1950s. He finished 63rd in the 18 km event at the 1952 Winter Olympics in Oslo. He was born in Predeal.

References

External links
18 km Olympic cross country results: 1948-52

1926 births
1981 deaths
Romanian male cross-country skiers
Olympic cross-country skiers of Romania
Cross-country skiers at the 1952 Winter Olympics
People from Predeal